Top Bahadur Rayamajhi or  is a Nepalese politician and former Deputy Prime Minister of Nepal. Rayamajhi was the member of both the Constituent Assembly. Rayamajhi is the secretary of CPN (UML).

Personal life 
He was born in Argha VDC, ward number 2 of Arghakhanchi district in year 1961.

Political life 
Rayamajhi assumed the post of Deputy Prime Minister and Minister for Energy in the First Oli cabinet. He is a standing committee member of Communist Party of Nepal (UML).  He started his political career back in 1974.

He served as the minister for various ministries of Government of Nepal in the past years including Ministry of Physical Planning and Constructions, Ministry of Local Development, Ministry of Peace and Reconstruction.

Electoral history

2017 legislative elections

2013 Constituent Assembly election

2008 Constituent Assembly election

See also 

 2021 split in Communist Party of Nepal (Maoist Centre)

References

Communist Party of Nepal (Unified Marxist–Leninist) politicians
Living people
Deputy Prime Ministers of Nepal
Government ministers of Nepal
People of the Nepalese Civil War
1961 births
Nepal MPs 2017–2022
Nepal Communist Party (NCP) politicians
People from Arghakhanchi District

Members of the 1st Nepalese Constituent Assembly
Members of the 2nd Nepalese Constituent Assembly
Communist Party of Nepal (Maoist Centre) politicians
Nepal MPs 2022–present